Posterior cerebral artery syndrome is a condition whereby the blood supply from the posterior cerebral artery (PCA) is restricted, leading to a reduction of the function of the portions of the brain supplied by that vessel: the occipital lobe, the inferomedial temporal lobe, a large portion of the thalamus, and the upper brainstem and midbrain.

This event restricts the flow of blood to the brain in a near-immediate fashion. The blood hammer is analogous to the water hammer in hydrology and it consists of a sudden increase of the upstream blood pressure in a blood vessel when the bloodstream is abruptly blocked by vessel obstruction. Complete understanding of the relationship between mechanical parameters in vascular occlusions is a critical issue, which can play an important role in the future diagnosis, understanding and treatment of vascular diseases.

Depending upon the location and severity of the occlusion, signs and symptoms may vary within the population affected with PCA syndrome. Blockages of the proximal portion of the vessel produce only minor deficits due to the collateral blood flow from the opposite hemisphere via the posterior communicating artery.  In contrast, distal occlusions result in more serious complications. Visual deficits, such as agnosia, prosopagnosia or cortical blindness (with bilateral infarcts) may be a product of ischemic damage to occipital lobe. Occlusions of the branches of the PCA that supply the thalamus can result in central post-stroke pain and lesions to the subthalamic branches can produce “a wide variety of deficits”.
 
Left posterior cerebral artery syndrome presents alexia without agraphia; the lesion is in the splenium of the corpus callosum.

Signs and symptoms
Peripheral Territory Lesions
 Contralateral homonymous hemianopsia   
 cortical blindness with bilateral involvement of the occipital lobe branches 
 visual agnosia 
 prosopagnosia 
 dyslexia, Anomic aphasia, color naming and discrimination problems 
 memory defect  
 topographic disorientation 
 
Central Territory Lesions
 central post-stroke (thalamic) pain: spontaneous pain, dysesthesias and sensory impairments 
 involuntary movements: chorea, intention tremor, hemiballismus 
 contralateral hemiplegia 
 Weber’s syndrome: occulomotor nerve palsy  
 Bálint's syndrome: loss of voluntary eye movements optic ataxia, asimultagnosia (inability to understand visual objects)

Diagnosis
1.CT
2.MRI

Treatment

References

External links 

Stroke
Syndromes